The Dirgha Agama is one of the Buddhist Agama. It corresponds to the Digha Nikaya of the Pāli Canon.

A Chinese translation of the text attributed to the Dharmaguptaka school is included in the Chinese Buddhist Canon. This translation was completed by Buddhayaśas and Zhu Fonian in the Late Qin dynasty, dated to 413 CE. This recension consists of 30 sūtras in contrast to the 34 suttas of the Dīgha Nikāya of the Pali Canon. The original Sanskrit text of the Dharmaguptaka recension is lost. However, in the 1990s, extensive fragments of a Sarvastivadin Sanskrit recension of the Dīrgha Āgama text were discovered. Portions of the Sarvastivadin recension also survive in Tibetan translation.

Translations
 The Canonical Book of the Buddha's Lengthy Discourses, Vol. I (BDK America)

 The Long Discourses (Dharma Pearls)

References

 
Tripiṭaka
Chinese Buddhist texts
Early Buddhist texts